Diane Pernet is a Paris-based American-born international fashion blogger and critic and founder of the international ASVOFF (A Shaded View on Fashion Film) festival.

Education and early career
Pernet was born in Washington, D.C. on October 8, and received a degree in documentary filmmaking from Temple University. In addition to creating several films of her own, she has maintained a love for cinema ever since. Becoming a New York City fashion designer in the 1980s, she maintained a label of her own for 13 years.

Relocating to Paris in 1990, Diane Pernet's first job there was as a costume designer for director Amos Gitai and his film Golem, l'Esprit d'Exile. Her work for the CBC's Fashion File programme led to an appointment at Hong Kong Joyce magazine, where she was the women's fashion editor for five years.

Fashion blog pioneer
Embracing fully the late-90s internet revolution, Diane took on a "Dr. Diane" fashion-advice column at Elle, and covered the runways for Vogue Paris. Success in these endeavours led to the creation of one of the internet's first fashion blogs in 2005, A Shaded View on Fashion (ASVOF), an online fashion platform whose early success led The New York Times to anoint her "the original style blogger". Also prolific on other social media platforms, she influences thousands with her daily fashion news and updates. Vogue Business called her a "genuinfluencer," meaning an influencer who is genuine and has nothing to sell.

Fashion film
In September 2006, to promote the launch of his brand's menswear line, Mark Eley of Eley Kishimoto commissioned her to make a documentary around a "Gumball 3000" (or "Gumball Rally") road-trip between London and Monte Carlo. It was this project and the interest that it generated that rekindled her love for cinema and motivated her to invent the 'fashion film' genre. Rather than exploring the idea through actual film-making, she decided to make it an open celebration in which anyone who shared her interest could participate. This was the genesis of her first "You Wear it Well" fashion-film festival that she, with photographer Dino Dinco, curated at the Los Angeles CineSpace from August 1, 2006.

This brainchild developed into a three-day A Shaded View on Fashion Film (ASVOFF) festival that was showcased for the first time in September 2008 at Paris' Jeu de Paume museum. With fashion film as a centerpiece, ASVOFF developed into a yearly travelling international event with satellite conferences, performances and exhibitions. Pernet has used the ASVOFF platform to support the photo-to-film transition for fashion mavericks including Nick Knight and Steven Klein.{
"type": "FeatureCollection",
"features": [
{ "type": "Feature", "properties": { "title": "Bilbao", "description": "2008at the Guggenheim Museum", "marker-size":"small" }, "geometry": { "type": "Point", "coordinates": [ -2.9349852, 43.263012600000017 ] } },
{ "type": "Feature", "properties": { "title": "Barcelona", "description": "2012with CaixaForum", "marker-size":"small" }, "geometry": { "type": "Point", "coordinates": [ 2.17340350000002, 41.3850639 ] } },
{ "type": "Feature", "properties": { "title": "Cannes", "description": "2016–2017at the Cannes Film Festival croisette's Villa Schweppes", "marker-size":"small" }, "geometry": { "type": "Point", "coordinates": [ 7.017369, 43.552847 ] } },
{ "type": "Feature", "properties": { "title": "ParisPassage du Desir, BETC", "description": "2009–2011main venue in 2009annex between 2010–2011", "marker-color":"#000" }, "geometry": { "type": "Point", "coordinates": [ 2.354438975440799,48.8708064315806 ] } },
{ "type": "Feature", "properties": { "title": "ParisCentre Georges pompidou", "description": "2009–2015main venue between 2011–2015awards ceremony, screening in 2009", "marker-color":"#000" }, "geometry": { "type": "Point", "coordinates": [ 2.352587132029595, 48.86046395480422 ] } },
{ "type": "Feature", "properties": { "title": "ParisClub de l'Etoile", "description": "2018", "marker-color":"#000" }, "geometry": { "type": "Point", "coordinates": [ 2.292557861868885,48.8739970714017 ] } },
{ "type": "Feature", "properties": { "title": "ParisPalais Brongniart", "description": "2017", "marker-size":"small" }, "geometry": { "type": "Point", "coordinates": [ 2.338094267079998,48.86710387531 ] } },
{ "type": "Feature", "properties": { "title": "Parisla Gaîté lyrique", "description": "2013", "marker-size":"small" }, "geometry": { "type": "Point", "coordinates": [ 2.350515913550986,48.8644006601632 ] } },
{ "type": "Feature", "properties": { "title": "Pariswith the Champs-Élysées Film Festival", "description": "2014", "marker-size":"small" }, "geometry": { "type": "Point", "coordinates": [ 2.300651478046356,48.8672812835348 ] } },
{ "type": "Feature", "properties": { "title": "ParisJeu de Paume", "description": "2008 Premiere", "marker-color":"#000" }, "geometry": { "type": "Point", "coordinates": [ 2.321188169685554,48.86364052726421 ] } },
{ "type": "Feature", "properties": { "title": "Hyères", "description": "2008International Festival of Fashion and Photography,", "marker-size":"small" }, "geometry": { "type": "Point", "coordinates": [ 6.128639, 43.120541 ] } },
{ "type": "Feature", "properties": { "title": "London", "description": "2010at the Barbican Art Gallery", "marker-size":"small" }, "geometry": { "type": "Point", "coordinates": [ -0.1277583, 51.5073509 ] } },
{ "type": "Feature", "properties": { "title": "London", "description": "2009at the Chelsea Arts Club", "marker-size":"small" }, "geometry": { "type": "Point", "coordinates": [ -0.1277583, 51.5073509 ] } },
{ "type": "Feature", "properties": { "title": "Rome", "description": "2014with AltaRoma", "marker-size":"small" }, "geometry": { "type": "Point", "coordinates": [ 12.4963655, 41.902783500000012 ] } },
{ "type": "Feature", "properties": { "title": "Rome", "description": "2018Palazzo Altemps ", "marker-size":"small" }, "geometry": { "type": "Point", "coordinates": [ 12.4963655, 41.902783500000012 ] } },
{ "type": "Feature", "properties": { "title": "Venice", "description": "2012Circuito-Off, Venice International Short Film Festival", "marker-size":"small" }, "geometry": { "type": "Point", "coordinates": [ 12.3155151, 45.440847400000017 ] } },
{ "type": "Feature", "properties": { "title": "Milan", "description": "2010at the Palazzo Morando with Vogue Italia", "marker-size":"small" }, "geometry": { "type": "Point", "coordinates": [ 9.189982, 45.464203500000011 ] } },
{ "type": "Feature", "properties": { "title": "Athens", "description": "2013with Fashion Workshop by Vicky KayaFashion on Screen", "marker-size":"small" }, "geometry": { "type": "Point", "coordinates": [ 23.7275388, 37.983809599999987 ] } },
{ "type": "Feature", "properties": { "title": "Tokyo", "description": "2013Cinema Rise X in Tokyo", "marker-size":"small" }, "geometry": { "type": "Point", "coordinates": [ 139.650310600000012, 35.6761919 ] } },
{ "type": "Feature", "properties": { "title": "Shanghai", "description": "2016at the China Academy of Art,Shanghai Institute of Design,the West Bund Art Center,the Power Station of Art, andthe Shanghai Himalayas Museum", "marker-size":"small" }, "geometry": { "type": "Point", "coordinates": [ 121.473701, 31.230416 ] } },
{ "type": "Feature", "properties": { "title": "Seoul", "description": "2010Daily Projects", "marker-size":"small" }, "geometry": { "type": "Point", "coordinates": [ 126.9779692, 37.566535 ] } },
{ "type": "Feature", "properties": { "title": "Boston", "description": "2016at the Museum of Fine Arts", "marker-size":"small" }, "geometry": { "type": "Point", "coordinates": [ -71.05888010000001, 42.3600825 ] } },
{ "type": "Feature", "properties": { "title": "Chicago", "description": "2015at the Gene Siskel Film Center", "marker-size":"small" }, "geometry": { "type": "Point", "coordinates": [ -87.6297982, 41.87811360000002 ] } },
{ "type": "Feature", "properties": { "title": "New York", "description": "2014Scope Art Fair in New York,with films by Michael Nyman", "marker-size":"small" }, "geometry": { "type": "Point", "coordinates": [ -74.0059728, 40.7127753 ] } },
{ "type": "Feature", "properties": { "title": "Miami", "description": "2011with Art Basel", "marker-size":"small" }, "geometry": { "type": "Point", "coordinates": [ -80.1917902, 25.761679799999989 ] } },
{ "type": "Feature", "properties": { "title": "Montreal", "description": "2013Festival du Nouveau Cinema", "marker-size":"small" }, "geometry": { "type": "Point", "coordinates": [ -73.567256, 45.501688900000012 ] } },
{ "type": "Feature", "properties": { "title": "Mexico City", "description": "2014with Trendsétera, Museo Franz Mayer", "marker-size":"small" }, "geometry": { "type": "Point", "coordinates": [ -99.133208, 19.4326077 ] } },
{ "type": "Feature", "properties": { "title": "Vienna", "description": "2012with Frame 0ut, Museum Quarter", "marker-size":"small" }, "geometry": { "type": "Point", "coordinates": [ 16.3738189, 48.208174299999989 ] } },
{ "type": "Feature", "properties": { "title": "Munich", "description": "2013with ABSOLUTE Creatives", "marker-size":"small" }, "geometry": { "type": "Point", "coordinates": [ 11.5819805, 48.135125300000013 ] } },
{ "type": "Feature", "properties": { "title": "Antwerp", "description": "2014with MoMu at MUSE", "marker-size":"small" }, "geometry": { "type": "Point", "coordinates": [ 4.402464299999989, 51.219447499999987 ] } },
{ "type": "Feature", "properties": { "title": "Arnhem", "description": "2013Arnhem Biennale", "marker-size":"small" }, "geometry": { "type": "Point", "coordinates": [ 5.8987296, 51.9851034 ] } },
{ "type": "Feature", "properties": { "title": "Amsterdam", "description": "2009with MASS", "marker-size":"small" }, "geometry": { "type": "Point", "coordinates": [ 4.9035614, 52.36798430000001 ] } },
{ "type": "Feature", "properties": { "title": "Copenhagen", "description": "2014with CPH DOX", "marker-size":"small" }, "geometry": { "type": "Point", "coordinates": [ 12.5683372, 55.676096799999968 ] } },
{ "type": "Feature", "properties": { "title": "Sofia", "description": "2017Nuboyana Film Studios", "marker-color":"#000" }, "geometry": { "type": "Point", "coordinates": [ 23.321867499999978, 42.697708199999987 ] } },
{ "type": "Feature", "properties": { "title": "Riga", "description": "2008with Moments", "marker-size":"small" }, "geometry": { "type": "Point", "coordinates": [ 24.1051865, 56.949648700000019 ] } },
{ "type": "Feature", "properties": { "title": "Cluj", "description": "2010with the Transylvania National Theatre", "marker-size":"small" }, "geometry": { "type": "Point", "coordinates": [ 23.623635299999972, 46.771210100000012 ] } },
{ "type": "Feature", "properties": { "title": "Łódź", "description": "2014LODZ Fashion Philosophy Week", "marker-size":"small" }, "geometry": { "type": "Point", "coordinates": [ 19.455983300000021, 51.759248500000012 ] } },
{ "type": "Feature", "properties": { "title": "Tbilisi", "description": "2011Georgian Fashion Week", "marker-size":"small" }, "geometry": { "type": "Point", "coordinates": [ 44.827096, 41.715137700000028 ] } },
{ "type": "Feature", "properties": { "title": "Bratislava", "description": "2019Bratislava Film Festival", "marker-size":"small" }, "geometry": { "type": "Point", "coordinates": [ 17.1077478, 48.1485965 ] } },
{ "type": "Feature", "properties": { "title": "Moscow", "description": "2010Russian Fashion Week", "marker-size":"small" }, "geometry": { "type": "Point", "coordinates": [ 37.617299899999978, 55.755826 ] } },
{ "type": "Feature", "properties": { "title": "Saint Petersburg", "description": "2013during Aurora Fashion Week", "marker-size":"small" }, "geometry": { "type": "Point", "coordinates": [ 30.33509860000002, 59.9342802 ] } },
{ "type": "Feature", "properties": { "title": "Kyiv", "description": "2010with Elle Ukraine", "marker-size":"small" }, "geometry": { "type": "Point", "coordinates": [ 30.5234, 50.4501 ] } },
{ "type": "Feature", "properties": { "title": "Minsk", "description": "2012Belarus Fashion Week", "marker-size":"small" }, "geometry": { "type": "Point", "coordinates": [ 27.56152440000001, 53.904539799999988 ] } },
{ "type": "Feature", "properties": { "title": "Vladivostok", "description": "2013with the Ministry of Culture of Russiaand Aurora Fashion Week", "marker-size":"small" }, "geometry": { "type": "Point", "coordinates": [ 131.8869243, 43.119809099999983 ] } }
]
}

In 2020, Diane Pernet signed a deal with Rocco Leo Gaglioti for a new A Shaded View on Fashion TV channel on the FNL Network. A Shaded View on Fashion (ASVOF) Season-12 broadcast for the first time on October 6, 2020.

Film appearances
Pernet's iconic personal style has attracted cinematographer attention as well: she has figured in the Robert Altman film Prêt-à-Porter, Roman Polanski's The Ninth Gate, Larry Clark's The Smell of Us and Ben Stiller's 2016 Zoolander 2. In 2021, she also appeared in Harmony Korine's film-documentary Balanciaga: The Lost Tape and the Season-2 finale for Emily in Paris.

Other projects
 2002–2011: Talent scout for the Hyères Festival
 2007: Co-curator of NOOVO, a fashion and photography festival in Santiago de Compostela.
 2007–2012: Co-editor-in-chief of Zoo Magazine (Germany)
 2010: Curator of CineOpera, a series of films by the composer/director Michael Nyman for Corso Como, a fashion/art exhibition and an ASVOFF film program at the 2010 New York Scope Art Fair.
 April 2012: editor of Ninja, a fashion, art and photography magazine
 2011–2017: fashion journalist for MFF (Milano Finanza Fashion).
 2014: launches a perfume line of four fragrances.
 2014–present: journalist for Modern Weekly, Shanghai.
 2014-2020: Modern Weekly
 2021: Member of the 'Georgian Fashion Foundation' advisory board 
 2021: Special Editor for The Edge Magazine

Recognition
On March 30, 2008, Pernet was chosen, as one of world's top three influential global bloggers, to take part in a panel celebrating a seminal fashion exhibition at New York's venerated Metropolitan Museum of Art. From July 2015, Business of Fashion listed her as one of fashion's 500 most influential actors.

Awards
 2012: Recipient of the distinguished FAD Medal from the Barcelona-based cultural institution devoted to the promotion of design and creativity, FAD (Fostering Arts and Design).
 April 18, 2013: in an award ceremony on April 18 that year, Diane Pernet is the recipient of the 13th edition of the Felicidad Duce Fashion award for her career as a fashion editor, for her role as internet fashion-writer pioneer, and her role as lead blogger of the genre, and her role as the godmother of emerging fashion talent, as well as for her sensitivity to the film genre that combines art, film and fashion photography. The Escola Superior de Disseny Felicidad Duce Barcelona created this award in honor of its founder, Ms. Felicidad Duce.
 September 2014: In Perth, Australia, the President and Executive board of the Asian Couture Federation awarded her the Award of Excellence for her outstanding contribution to fashion journalism.
 May 8, 2015: Pernet was invited by the School of the Art Institute of Chicago to be their yearly Legend of Fashion honoree for her career as a critic, filmmaker and style icon.
 2013: Pernet is accepted into the Business of Fashion "BOF 500", a list of their 'most influential' fashion movers and icons, and from September 2015, she was promoted to their 500 Hall of Fame, the highest honour reserved for those who have demonstrated sustained achievement over the course of their fashion careers.
 2017: elected Female Style Icon by Fashion.Net.
 October 2018: Pernet was awarded the Inspirational–Visionary award by BIG SEE (BIG South-East Europe) for her work in developing the fashion film genre, for and her blogging career, as well as for her influence in south-eastern Europe's fashion design and art trades.

Awards committees
 2016: President of the Forward Fashion Tech Awards by Showroom Prive.
 2017: Nominator for the Beazley award 2017. Designer nominated: Aitor Throup.
2019: Gwand Advisory Board Sustainable Fashion Festival

Personal life
At the age of 28 Pernet married her first husband Norman, who she has met at the dentist chair. He died in a car accident three years later. After his death, Diane has been married three more times.

References

External links 
 AShadedViewOnFashion.com
 Garger, Ilya (February 20, 2006). "Land of Styles". Time.
 The Times: 40 bloggers who really matter
 The Times: Bloggers are snapping up front row seats at London Fashion Week
 Diane Pernet talks about her personal style
 Collin McDowell: Diane Pernet, The Shaded Lady 
 T: DIane Pernet: The original style blogger on fashion and film
 L'Officiel: Diane Pernet: Rencontre avec la grande dame noire de la mode
 Diane Pernet: Blogger Profile
 Les films de mode avec Diane Pernet

American bloggers
Living people
Writers from Washington, D.C.
Temple University alumni
Fashion editors
French diarists
Infotainers
American emigrants to France
French television personalities
American fashion journalists
American women journalists
French women writers
American women bloggers
21st-century American non-fiction writers
Women diarists
Women magazine editors
Year of birth missing (living people)
21st-century American women writers